Yuuna (ゆうな) is a feminine Japanese given name. It can have many different meanings depending on the kanji used.

People with given name
 , Japanese voice actress
 , Japanese manga artist
 , Japanese child actress
 , Japanese model and actress
 Yuuna Mimura, Japanese voice actress who voiced in the Hanebado! anime
 Yuuna Suzuki, Japanese idol and professional wrestler who went by the ring name Yuna Manase in the World Wonder Ring Stardom

Fictional characters
 Yuuna Akashi, a character from the Negima manga
 Yuuna Roma Seiran, a character from the Mobile Suit Gundam Seed anime
 Yuuna Okuyama, a character from the Hori-san to Miyamura-kun manga
 Yuuna Sakashita, a character from the Shirobako anime
 Yuuna Yunohana, the title character from Yuuna and the Haunted Hot Springs manga

Other uses
 Yuuna and the Haunted Hot Springs, manga and anime series

See also
 Yoona, Im Yoon-ah, South Korean singer and actress
 Younha, Go Yun-ha, South Korean singer
 Yuna (disambiguation)
 Yunna (disambiguation)
 Yunnan, Chinese province

Japanese feminine given names